Jean Lucien Deplace (12 July 1944 – 30 November 2015) was a French cellist. Many well-known cellists studied with Deplace. Deplace studied with Maurice Maréchal and won first prize for cello in 1963 at the Paris Conservatory. Deplace went on to win awards in international competitions including; the Grand Prize of the Geneva International Music Competition, the Budapest Grand Prize and the Florence Grand Prize. Deplace was also the recipient of a Sasha Schneider Foundation award. Deplace performed with leading orchestras including Orchestre Philharmonique de Radio France, Orchestre de Monte Carlo, the Bavarian Radio Symphony Orchestra and at the Orchestra del Maggio Musicale Fiorentino.

In 1971 he formed a duo with the pianist Andrée Plaine that gained recognition in Europe, North America and Japan.  Deplace was appointed principal cello ("super-soloist") of the Orchestre philharmonique de Strasbourg. In 1981 he was appointed professor of cello at the Conservatoire national supérieur musique et danse de Lyon.

Deplace died on 30 November 2015 at the age of 71.

References

External links
Photos of pianist Andrée Plaine and cellist Jean Deplace

1944 births
2015 deaths
French classical cellists
20th-century classical musicians
20th-century French musicians
People from Loire (department)
Winners of the Geneva International Music Competition
Prize-winners of the ARD International Music Competition
Conservatoire de Paris alumni
20th-century cellists